Vince Cross (22 February 1919 – 7 June 1994) was an  Australian rules footballer who played with North Melbourne in the Victorian Football League (VFL).

Notes

External links 

1919 births
1994 deaths
Australian rules footballers from Victoria (Australia)
North Melbourne Football Club players